The Brokke Power Station  is a hydroelectric power station located in the municipality Valle in Agder county, Norway. The Norwegian National Road 9 runs past the station. The water flowing down through the tunnel is used to produce the hydroelectric power.

References 

Hydroelectric power stations in Norway
Buildings and structures in Agder
Dams in Norway
Valle, Norway